This is a list of films produced in Taiwan ordered by year of release. For an alphabetical list of Taiwanese films see :Category:Taiwanese films

2010

2011

2012

2013

2014

2015

2016

2017

2019

References

External links
 Taiwanese film at the Internet Movie Database

2010s
2010s in Taiwan
Taiwan